Alfred Portale (born July 5, 1954) is an American chef, author, and restaurateur known as a pioneer in the New American cuisine movement.

Restaurants
After graduating top of his class from the Culinary Institute of America in 1981, Portale became the chef at Gotham Bar and Grill in 1985 and took it to new heights with his beautiful plating and insistence on high-quality ingredients.

Portale's first sous-chef at Gotham was Tom Valenti. Other notable chefs who have worked under Chef Portale include Bill Telepan, Wylie Dufresne, Tom Colicchio, Christopher Lee, and Jason Hall. The current chef de cuisine of Gotham Bar and Grill is Livio Velardo.

In October 2008, Portale opened Gotham Steak at the Fontainebleau Miami Beach in Miami Beach, Florida, and has since stated in relation to the opening and the current economy that, "You don’t want to open a molecular cuisine place now, but I would open a steakhouse again in another city, even in this climate."

In November 2019, Portale opened Portale Restaurant in the Chelsea neighborhood of New York City, featuring a “contemporary Italian menu.”

Publishing and television
Portale is the author of three cookbooks in collaboration with others and alone: Gotham Bar and Grill Cookbook (1997), and Twelve Seasons Cookbook: A Month-by-Month Guide to the Best There is to Eat  (2000), and Simple Pleasures: Home Cooking from the Gotham Bar and Grill's Acclaimed Chef  (2004).

He has also made television appearances, most notably as a guest judge on the episode of Top Chef originally broadcast on June 27, 2007, and as a featured chef with Julia Child in her PBS series “In Julia's Kitchen with Master Chefs” on December 16, 1995.

Cookbooks 
 Alfred Portale Simple Pleasures: Home Cooking from the Gotham Bar and Grill's Acclaimed Chef (2004) 
 Alfred Portale's Gotham Bar and Grill Cookbook (1997) 
 Alfred Portale's Twelve Seasons Cookbook: A Month-by-Month Guide to the Best There is to Eat (2000) 
 Cooking by the Book – Alfred Portale

References

External links 
 Gotham Bar and Grill Official Website
 Gotham on-line reservations at OpenTable.com
 Gotham Profile with video at SavoryNewYork.com
 
 

{{ |title=Portale: About Us  |url= https://www.portalerestaurant.com/about/ |work=portalerestaurant.com.com |}}

Living people
American chefs
American male chefs
American food writers
American people of Italian descent
1954 births
Head chefs of Michelin starred restaurants
Writers from Buffalo, New York
Culinary Institute of America alumni
James Beard Foundation Award winners